Gene Wlasiuk (born February 24, 1936) was a Canadian football player who played for the Saskatchewan Roughriders. He won the Grey Cup with Saskatchewan in 1966.

References

1936 births
Canadian football people from Winnipeg
Players of Canadian football from Manitoba
Winnipeg Blue Bombers players
Saskatchewan Roughriders players
Canadian football defensive backs
Living people